Pawi may refer to:

Pawi (automobile), an early automobile made in Germany
the Lai people, who were formerly known as Pawi
the Trinidad piping-guan, Aburria pipile, an endangered bird in the guan family Cracidae